Sar Jalal (formerly Jalal Khurd) was a caravanserai located along an old stretch of the Grand Trunk Road in Pakistan. The caravanserai contains: 
 a Mughal era water tank, descended with stairs in it, constructed basically as farood gah to serve the army beside the old Grand Trunk Road. Jalal Khan Ghakkhar, a local chief of Ghakkhars to represent Mughals, constructed the tank (Sar) to be called Sar Jalal in his name, in addition to a patch of tunnel still visible, was also dug out for overflowing water;
 a mosque dating back to the Tughlaq dynasty.
 a shrine to Syed Jahan Shah Badshah Naqashbandi; anniversary (Urs) is celebrated annually on every first Thursday of the Bikrami month of Jeth to be continued for consecutive three days.
 remnants of historical buildings like Police Station of Sarkar Khalsa, Caravanserai, Rani Palace and other buildings.

See also

Katasraj Temple
Mankiala stupa
Pharwala
Rawat Fort
Rohtas Fort

References 

Mughal architecture
Jhelum District